This incomplete list of earthquakes in Croatia includes major earthquakes with epicenters within the country's current borders, as well as earthquakes that had a significant impact within Croatia.

There was no systematic gathering of earthquake data in Croatia before the 19th century. The magnitudes and epicenters of earlier earthquakes cannot be reliably determined, although some estimates exist.

Following the 1963 Skopje earthquake, SFR Yugoslavia, of which SR Croatia was a part of, implemented its first Code for Construction in Seismic Regions in 1964.

Earthquakes

See also 

 List of earthquakes in Italy
 List of earthquakes in Slovenia
 List of earthquakes in Balkan
 List of earthquakes in Bosnia and Herzegovina
 List of earthquakes in Albania

References

Bibliography

External links
 

Croatia
Earthquakes